Tchoukball  is an indoor team sport developed in the 1970s by Swiss biologist Hermann Brandt. Brandt was concerned about the number of injuries in sport at the time and as part of an educational study he wanted to create a sport that reduced injuries, was not aggressive between players and enabled people of all shapes, sizes, genders, cultures, and backgrounds to play together.

The sport is usually played on an indoor court measuring 27 metres by 16 metres. At each end there is a rebounder (a device similar to a trampoline off which the ball bounces) which measures one square metre and a semicircular D-shaped forbidden zone measuring three metres in radius. Each team can score on both ends of the court, and comprises 12 players, of whom 7 may be on the court at any one time. In order to score a point, the ball must be thrown by an attacking player, hit the rebounder and bounce outside the 'D' without being caught by the defending team. Physical contact is prohibited, and defenders may not attempt to intercept the attacking team's passes. Players may take three steps with the ball, hold the ball for a maximum of three seconds, and teams may not pass the ball more than three times before shooting at the rebounder.

Tchoukball is most popular in Singapore, Switzerland and Taiwan, but has become an international sport, with national federations in over 60 countries. It is governed by the International Tchoukball Federation (FITB), which was founded in 1971.

History
Tchoukball was created in Switzerland by Hermann Brandt, who was concerned by the numerous serious injuries among athletes resulting from sports prone to aggression and physical contact. He believed that sports should be not only for champions, but also contribute to the creation of a better and more humane society. He designed tchoukball to contain elements of handball (it is played with hands, and the balls used are similar), volleyball (as the defending team must prevent the ball from falling) and squash (since there is a rebound).

Basic rules

Court

 The court size that is generally used is 27 m × 17 m. However, there are variations to this such as in beach tchoukball where a court size of 21 m × 12 m is used.
 One rebounder is placed at each end of the field of play
 In front of each rebounder, a D shaped semi-circle measuring 3 m in radius must be drawn; it defines the limits of the 'forbidden zone'
 The lines of the zones are considered part of the zone itself, e.g. the line marking the semicircle forbidden zone is considered part of the forbidden zone, while the line around the entire court is considered a part of the court

Ball

Depending on the category of players (Men/Women/M18/M15/M12), different sizes of balls are used ranging from a circumference of 54 cm to 60 cm and weighs between 325 grams to 475 grams.

Scoring

Two teams of 7 players each (men or women) compete to score points with the team with the most points at the end winning the game. 
When a team gains a point, control of the ball is transferred to the other team.
 In tchoukball either team can score at either end of the court.
 A point is scored when the ball rebounds after hitting either of the 2 rebounders and touches the ground outside the forbidden zone, any part of the defending player's body below the knees, or touches the defending player while he is still in the forbidden zone.
 A point is given to the non-attacking team when the attacking team shoots and misses the rebounder, or the ball rebounds outside the playing area (either out of the court or in the forbidden zone).
 If a shot is caught by the defending team, the defending team can proceed to attack immediately.

Positions
Each team comprises the following positions:
 2 Right Shooters
 2 Left Shooters
 2 or 3 defenders
 1 Centre (or none if 3 defenders are used)
Each side of the court comprises a left shooter, right shooter and 1 or 2 defenders, while the centre usually stays near the middle of the court if this formation is used. The shooters are generally in charge of shooting although in some cases the defender can also take the shot. The defenders are in charge of coordinating the first line of defence while the centre pivot takes charge of the second line of defence.
However other formations include not using a centre pivot, the team would bypass the centre and throw full length court passes directly to the shooters/inners. This gives an extra first line defender or a dedicated second line defender.

Playing the game

 The player can take 3 steps and is not allowed to bounce the ball on the ground between these steps.
 When a pass is dropped or not completed ( the ball touches the ground), the other team gets possession
 The defending team cannot hamper the attacking one, and is a fully non-contact sport.
 The player with the ball is only allowed to hold the ball for 3 seconds or less

Variant
 Tchoukball (Indoor)
 Beach Tchoukball
 Wheelchair Tchoukball
 University Tchoukball
 Youth Tchoukball

International Tchoukball Federation (FITB)
The FITB, founded in 1971, is based in Geneva, Switzerland. It now comprises 47 member associations and 22 (15+7) countries with a designated FITB Representative.  It supports and advises national associations and individuals willing to spread tchoukball in new areas. For instance, tchoukball was recently integrated in the school program of some regions of Senegal. The FITB was a demonstration sport in the 2009 World Games, which took place in Kaohsiung, Taiwan.

69 Members in March 2022:

Number of Members by Regions:
 Asia Pacific : 15 + 2 + 5 = 22
 Africa : 14 + 6 + 1 = 21
 Americas : 7 + 2 + 1 = 10
 Europe : 11 + 5 + 0 = 16

Official

FITB Representative

Non Member, without local federation, but have team

World events

World Tchoukball Championships

World Beach Tchoukball Championships

Tchoukball at the World Games

World Youth Tchoukball Championships

World University Tchoukball Championships

World Youth Beach Tchoukball Championships

Regional events

Asia Pacific Tchoukball Championships

Asia Pacific University Tchoukball Championships

Asia Pacific Beach Tchoukball Championships

Asia Pacific Youth Tchoukball Championships

Southeast Asia Tchoukball Championships

South Asian Tchoukball Championships

East Asian Tchoukball Championships

European Tchoukball Championships

European Youth Tchoukball Championships

African Tchoukball Championships

East African Tchoukball Championships

Pan American Tchoukball Championships

FITB presidents

See also
 Tchoukball at the 2009 World Games

Notes

External links

Associations
FITB - International Tchoukball Federation - official site

Team sports
Ball games
Sports originating in Switzerland